This is a list of the songs that reached number-one position in official Polish single chart in ZPAV in 2016.

Chart history

Number-one artists

See also 
 Polish Music Charts

References 

Poland
2016
No On